The 2018–19 Incarnate Word Cardinals women's basketball team will represent the University of the Incarnate Word in the 2018-19 NCAA Division I women's basketball season. They were led by coach Christy Smith, in her third season. They finished the season 5–24, 5–13 in Southland play to finish in a tie for tenth place. They failed to qualify for the Southland women's tournament.

On March 10, Christy Smith's contract was not renewed. She finished with a 3 year record of 21–68.

Previous season
The Cardinals finished the 2017–18 season 5–24, 4–14 in Southland play to finish in eleventh place. They failed to qualify for the Southland women's tournament.

Roster
Sources:

Schedule
Sources:

|-
!colspan=8 style=|Non-conference regular season
|-

|-
!colspan=8 style=|Southland regular season
|-

See also
2018–19 Incarnate Word Cardinals men's basketball team

References

Incarnate Word
Incarnate Word Cardinals women's basketball seasons
Incarnate Word
Incarnate Word